Fatima bint Muhammad ibn Ahmad al-Samarqandi was a twelfth-century Muslim scholar and jurist.

Biography

Early life 
Fatima was born to Muhammad ibn Ahmad al-Samarqandi, a preeminent Hanafi jurist who took active part in his daughter’s education. He authored the book Tuhfat al-Fuqaha'.

Marriage and career 
She married 'Ala' al-Din al-Kasani, a student of her father and an expert of fiqh. Fatima’s dowry was Al-Kasani’s book, Bada'i' al-Sana'i' (The Most Marvellous of Beneficial Things), a commentary that he wrote on her father’s book, Tuhfat al-Fuqaha'. Her father was so impressed by the book that he accepted it as her dowry on behalf of Ala over the kings that had asked for her hand and offered more.
When her husband had any doubts and erred in issuing a fatwa, she would inform him the correct judgment and explain the reason for the mistake. Although al-Kasani was a competent jurist, Fatima corrected and edited his legal opinions.

Fatima al-Samarqandi was a personal counselor of Nur ad-Din, the mentor of Saladin.

Legacy 
According to researcher Hoda Gamal, she is credited with establishing the tradition of setting up voluntary iftars for male fuqaha.

See also
 List of female Muslim scholars
 List of Hanafis
 List of Ash'aris and Maturidis

References

Hanafis
Maturidis
People from Samarkand
Uzbekistani Muslims
Women scholars of the medieval Islamic world
12th-century women
12th-century Muslim scholars of Islam
1185 deaths
Year of birth unknown